Mira River may refer to:
 Mira River (Nova Scotia), a river on Cape Breton Island
 Mira River (Ecuador and Colombia)
 Mira River (Portugal), a river in southwestern Alentejo

See also 
 Mira (disambiguation)